North Camp is a suburb of Farnborough, Hampshire. It covers most of the southern part of the town, adjoining Aldershot Military Town as part of the Farnborough/Aldershot Built-up Area .

History
North Camp has been closely linked to both Aldershot and Farnborough for much of its existence.
It was originally the Northern Camp of Aldershot Garrison, which was divided by the Basingstoke Canal, hence the name North Camp.

Shopping
North Camp has a number of specialist shops and services including a motorcycle shop and several specialist food and clothes shops. The nearby town centres of Farnborough and Aldershot have much larger shopping areas, with a higher number of major chain stores.

Transport

Road
The main roads within North Camp include:
 A325 linking North Camp to Farnborough and Aldershot.
 A3011 (Lynchford Road) which leads towards Ash Vale and Mytchett.
 B3403 (Alexandra Road) which forms the spine of South Farnborough and North Camp

The area is also bordered by the A331 which leads to Guildford and Sandhurst.

Bus
North Camp is served by two public bus routes: 
Goldline 1 between Aldershot and Camberley every 10 minutes, operated by Stagecoach in Hants & Surrey.
41 between Farnborough and Ash every hour, operated by Stagecoach in Hants & Surrey

It is also served by school bus route 401, operated by Stagecoach to All Hallows School.

Rail
North Camp Station is on the North Downs Line with 2 trains per hour between Reading and Redhill in both directions, with one of the Reading to Redhill trains continuing to Gatwick Airport railway station.

References

External links
Rushmoor Borough Council
North Camp Village official website

Populated places in Hampshire
Rushmoor
Farnborough, Hampshire